The Battle of Corupedium, also called Koroupedion, Corupedion or Curupedion ( or Κόρου πεδίον, "the plain of Kyros or Koros") was the last battle between the Diadochi, the rival successors to Alexander the Great. It was fought in 281 BC between the armies of Lysimachus and Seleucus I Nicator. Lysimachus had ruled Thrace for decades and parts of western Asia Minor (Turkey) ever since the Battle of Ipsus. Recently he had finally gained control over Macedon. Seleucus ruled the Seleucid Empire, including lands currently covered by modern eastern Turkey, Syria, Lebanon, Israel, Iraq, and Iran. Almost nothing is known about the battle itself save that Seleucus won the battle. Lysimachus died during the fighting. According to Memnon of Heraclea's History of Heraclea Pontica, Lysimachus was killed by a javelin thrown by Malacon, a Heracleian soldier serving under Seleucus.

Although the victory gave Seleucus nominal control over nearly every part of Alexander's empire, save the Ptolemaic Kingdom of Egypt, his victory was short-lived. After crossing the Hellespont to take possession of Lysimachus' European holdings not long after the battle, Seleucus was assassinated by Ptolemy Keraunos and Macedon swiftly became independent once again.

The two men had been rivals for a long time as Lysimachus wished to expand his influence east, while Seleucus wished to expand his influence west, however, the event that actually started the war was the murder of Agathocles. Agathocles was the eldest son of Lysimachus and his first wife Nicaea and was the heir to his father’s realm. However, Lysimachus’ third and current wife, Arsinoe, wanted her children on the throne and so conspired with Ptolemy Keraunos to have Agathocles killed. They accused him of plotting with Seleucus to take the throne, and Lysimachus was convinced and put his son to death. This terrible act led many cities in Asia Minor to revolt against the rule of Thrace. Agathocles’ widow and their children fled to Seleucus, giving him an opportunity to attack Lysimachus when he was weak, which he could not refuse. He invaded and subsequently won at Corupedion.

References

External links 
 Livius.org: Corupedium

281 BC
280s BC conflicts
Battles of the Diadochi
Battles involving Macedonia (ancient kingdom)
Battles involving the Seleucid Empire
History of Manisa Province